A foldable or folding machine gun (or FMG) is a type of submachine gun designed to be folded for concealed carry and can often be disguised.

Examples of foldable machine guns include:
 ARES FMG
 FMG-9
 Hotchkiss Type Universal
 PP-90

Submachine guns